Dianshan Lake is a freshwater lake west of Zhujiajiao, Qingpu District, in Shanghai, China. Measuring , it is the largest freshwater lake in Shanghai and the upstream of the Huangpu River.

The Shanghai Water Sports Centre was supposed to be the venue for the 2021 World Rowing Championships, but was cancelled due to COVID-19 pandemic.

Transportation 
Oriental Land station of Shanghai's Line 17 serves the eastern side of the lake. A number of public transport buses and taxis are available.

References 

 Water quality of Lake Dianshan

Bodies of water of Shanghai
Lakes of China